Expedition Linné is a 2007 documentary film made for the 300th anniversary of the birth of Swedish botanist, physician, and zoologist Carl Linnaeus. The film was made by Swedish wildlife photographer Mattias Klum and journalist Folke Rydén and is intended to increase public understanding of and respect for nature in a journey through the seven continents, into space, and across the oceans.

Prince Carl Philip of Sweden was on the film team for training in his studies of graphic design.

References

External links 
 
 

2007 films
2000s Swedish-language films
Swedish documentary films
Commemoration of Carl Linnaeus
2007 documentary films
2000s Swedish films